Högdalen metro station is on the Green line of the Stockholm metro, located in Högdalen, Söderort, Stockholm Municipality. The station was inaugurated on 22 November 1954 as the south terminus of the extension from Stureby. On 13 November 1959, the line was extended south to Rågsved. Högdalen metro station is connected to Högdalsdepån, a depot for subway trains.

Högdalsdepån (Högdalen Depot) is a depot for cars of Stockholm metro, opened in 1957 and is connected to Högdalen metro station.

A southerly extension of the Blue line of the Stockholm metro is currently under construction and expected to be opened for the passengers in 2030. As part of this development, the Blue line will take over this station.

References

External links

Images of Högdalen

Green line (Stockholm metro) stations
Railway stations opened in 1954